The Four Statesmen is a Barbershop quartet that won the 1967 SPEBSQSA international competition.  They were literally from four different states, and long distance practice was a challenge.  They were from Connecticut, Massachusetts, New Hampshire and Rhode Island.

References 
 AIC entry (archived)

Barbershop quartets
Barbershop Harmony Society